The BMW 3/20 PS was the first BMW automobile designed entirely by BMW.  It was manufactured from 1932 to 1934, replacing the 3/15 model that was initially an Austin 7 manufactured under licence from the Austin Motor Company.

The new engine design also had a water pump and an overhead valve cylinder head. These design changes caused the engine to generate 20 hp, but did not change the taxable horsepower rating of 3 PS, thus giving the model designation 3/20.

The 3/20 was larger than the 3/15, with an  wheelbase and a body  lower than the 3/15. The 3/20 used a backbone frame unrelated to the 3/15's Austin Seven "A" frame. It inherited the 3/15 DA-4's independent front suspension and added a swing axle independent rear suspension, using a transverse leaf spring similar to that used at the front. The standard bodies for the car were built by Daimler-Benz in Sindelfingen.

Journalist and engineer Josef Ganz, who had criticized the 3/15 DA-4's suspension system in the magazine Motor-Kritik, was contracted in July 1931 as a consultant in the design of the 3/20 AM-1.

Four versions of the 3/20 were built: AM 1, AM 2, AM 3 and AM 4, where AM denoted Automobil München.

References 
Citations

Sources

3 20
Rear-wheel-drive vehicles
Cars introduced in 1932
1930s cars
Automobiles with backbone chassis